Clean Your Clock is the thirteenth live album by the band Motörhead, released on 10 June 2016, approximately six months after the death of vocalist and bassist Lemmy. Lemmy dedicated the song "Doctor Rock" to Phil Taylor, Motörhead's drummer from 1976-1983 and from 1987-1992, who died a week before the live album was recorded.

Recording
The album was recorded during their European 40th Anniversary tour. It is compiled from two sold-out shows at the Zenith in Munich, Germany, on 20 and 21 November 2015 (both nights were filmed but only the first show was released). Unbeknownst to UDR Records at the time, these two shows would turn out to be the last Motörhead live shows that were recorded professionally.

Release

Formats
The show was released as a live album and as a concert film in a variety of formats:
 2 LP coloured vinyl (gate-fold sleeve w/pop-up artwork) and download card
 Single CD 
 DVD and CD
 Blu-Ray and CD
 Box set: 2 LP coloured vinyl (gate-fold sleeve w/pop-up artwork), download card, DVD, CD (mini gate-fold sleeve w/pop-up artwork, Blu-ray and a metal pin
 Box set (UDR exclusive): 2 LP coloured vinyl (gate-fold sleeve w/pop-up artwork), download card, DVD, CD (mini gate-fold sleeve w/pop-up artwork), Blu-ray and a silver or gold pin
 Digital download

YouTube
Four songs from the Blu-ray were released on UDR's YouTube channel. These are:
 "Bomber"
 "When the Sky Comes Looking for You"
 "Overkill"
 "The Chase Is Better Than the Catch"

Track listing

Personnel
 Lemmy Kilmister – bass, lead vocals
 Phil Campbell – guitars, backing vocals
 Mikkey Dee – drums

Charts

References

2016 live albums
Live albums published posthumously
Motörhead live albums